The 1921 Purple Wildcats team represented Northwestern University during the 1921 Big Ten Conference football season. In their second year under head coach Elmer McDevitt, the Purple compiled a 1–6 record (0–5 against Big Ten Conference opponents) and finished in last place in the Big Ten Conference.

Schedule

References

Northwestern
Northwestern Wildcats football seasons
Northwestern Purple football